Bertolini is an Italian surname. Notable people with the surname include:

Adrián Bertolini (born 1978), Uruguayan basketball player
Alessandro Bertolini (born 1971), cyclist
Andrea Bertolini (born 1973), race car driver
Christopher Bertolini, American film writer and producer 
Gioele Bertolini (born 1995), Italian cyclist
Jack Bertolini (1934–2021), Scottish professional footballer
José Elguero Bertolini (born 1934), Spanish chemist  
Luigi Bertolini (1904-1977), football player
Mark Bertolini (born 1956), former CEO of Aetna
Massimo Bertolini (born 1974), Italian tennis player
 (born 1994), Venezuelan tennis player 
Pietro Bertolini (1859-1920), Italian statesman
Roberto Bertolini (born 1985), Italian javelin thrower
Veronica Bertolini (born 1995), Italian gymnast

See also
 Bertol (surname)
 Bertoli
 Bertolin
 Bertolino
 Bertolo
 Bertoloni

Surnames of South Tyrolean origin
Italian-language surnames